Bohdan Teodorovych Novosiadlyi (pseudo: Taras Bogdanyuk; born May 12, 1956, Butsniv, Ukraine) is a Ukrainian journalist, publicist, local historian, editor. Member of the National Union of journalists of Ukraine (1982), Taras Shevchenko scientific society (2005). Honored journalist of Ukraine (2014).

Biography 
Graduated from the Faculty of journalism of Lviv University (1982).

In 1980-1990 — correspondent of the Ternopil regional newspaper "Podolske Slovo", editor of the newspapers "Luch", "Studencheskiy Vestnik", "Pedagogicheskiy Vestnik", magazines "Vatra-advertising and business information", "Vestnik of the OleKander Smakula Foundation", literary editor of the newspaper "God's sower" of the Ternopil-Zboriv Archdiocese of the UGCC.

Since 1996 — head of the Department of the newspaper "Svoboda", since 1999-editor — in-chief of the newspaper "Novaya oselya" (all-Ternopil).

In 2005-2007 — editor of the newspaper "Svoboda", in 2008-2016-deputy editor of the same newspaper.

Since April 2017-Editor-in-chief of the newspaper "Selsky gospodar plus".

Creativity 
Author of numerous publications in Ukrainian and foreign periodicals, editor of a number of scientific, historical and literary works. Author of local history essays: "Butsniv - the village over Seret" (1998), "Butsnov. An excursion into the past on the waves of love" (2006).

References 

Living people
1956 births
Ukrainian journalists
Ukrainian editors